The Amarillo Wranglers served as a farm team to the Pittsburgh Penguins of the National Hockey League. Based in Amarillo, Texas, the Wranglers were members of the Central Hockey League (CHL).

The franchise was founded by Jack McGregor, who was also founder of the Penguins. McGregor served as the Wranglers' team president. McGregor and the Penguins tried twice to bring hockey to Amarillo, both times found it too costly, due to poor attendance.

The Wranglers participated in the 1968-69 season, then suspended operations. They then returned to the CHL for the 1970-71 season, but permanently ceased operations after that season.

Season-by-season record
Note: GP = Games played, W = Wins, L = Losses, T = Ties, Pts = Points, GF = Goals for, GA = Goals against, PIM = Penalties in minutes

Central Hockey League

Amarillo Wranglers all-time roster

Trainer - Jim McKenzie

References

External links
 Amarillo Wranglers at The Internet Hockey Database

Central Professional Hockey League teams
Defunct Central Hockey League teams
Defunct ice hockey teams in Texas
Sports in Amarillo, Texas
Ice hockey clubs established in 1968
Ice hockey clubs disestablished in 1971
1968 establishments in Texas
1971 disestablishments in Texas
Pittsburgh Penguins minor league affiliates